Banner is an unincorporated community in Calhoun County, Mississippi, United States.

History
The population in 1900 was 114.  Around that time, the settlement had a money order post office, two churches, and several stores.

A post office first began operation under the name Banner in 1850.

Notable person
 Jim Joe Edwards, professional baseball player from 1922–1928.

References

Unincorporated communities in Calhoun County, Mississippi
Unincorporated communities in Mississippi